The 2020–21 Utah Utes women's basketball team represented the University of Utah during the 2020–21 NCAA Division I women's basketball season. The Utes, were led by sixth year head coach Lynne Roberts, played their home games at the Jon M. Huntsman Center and were members of the Pac-12 Conference.

Previous season
The Utes finished the season 14–17, 6–12 in Pac-12 play to finish in eighth place. They advanced to the Quarterfinals of the Pac-12 women's tournament where they lost to Oregon.  The NCAA tournament and WNIT were cancelled due to the COVID-19 pandemic.

Roster 

Source:

Schedule and results 
Source: 

|-
!colspan=9 style=| Regular Season

|-
!colspan=9 style=| Pac-12 Women's Tournament

Rankings

Coaches did not release a Week 2 poll and AP does not release a poll after the NCAA Tournament.

See also
2020–21 Utah Utes men's basketball team

References 

Utah Utes women's basketball seasons
Utah
Utah Utes